"Fuck Compton" is song written and performed by American rapper Tim Dog, released in 1991 through Ruffhouse Records as the lead single from the rapper's debut studio album Penicillin on Wax. It is a diss track criticizing the West Coast hip hop scene, including the Compton-based group N.W.A and its members Eazy-E and Dr. Dre as well as the latter's then-girlfriend Michel'le. The song is often credited for igniting the East Coast–West Coast rivalry of the 1990s. Production was handled by Ultramagnetic MCs' member Ced-Gee and Tim Dog himself. The song peaked atop of the US Billboard Hot Rap Songs chart. Later in 2018 it was place at #19 on Complex's "The 50 Best Hip-Hop Diss Songs" list.

Track listing

Personnel
Timothy "Tim Dog" Blair – lyrics, vocals, producer, mixing
Cedric "Ced-Gee" Miller – producer, mixing
Kurt Woodley – mixing
Joe "The Butcher" Nicolo – engineering
Leo "Swift" Morris – additional engineering
Howie Weinberg – mastering
Francesca Restrepo – art direction
Jesse Frohman – photography

Charts

References

External links

See also
List of notable diss tracks

1991 songs
American hip hop songs
Diss tracks
East Coast hip hop songs
Hardcore hip hop songs
Ruffhouse Records singles
Songs about Los Angeles
Songs about New York (state)